Noble Gordon "Jorgy" Jorgensen (May 18, 1925 – November 2, 1982) was an American professional basketball player. He was a center in the National Basketball Association (NBA) and other leagues.

His brother was Basketball Association of America player Roger Jorgensen, who he was teammates with as members of the Pittsburgh Ironmen in the 1946–47 season.

BAA/NBA career statistics

Regular season

Playoffs

References

External links

1925 births
1982 deaths
American men's basketball players
Centers (basketball)
Iowa Hawkeyes men's basketball players
Pittsburgh Ironmen players
Sheboygan Red Skins players
Syracuse Nationals players
Tri-Cities Blackhawks players
Westminster Titans men's basketball players